St Francis Xavier's College is a Roman Catholic secondary school and sixth form with academy status located in Woolton, Liverpool, England. Year 7 to Year 11 are male only, whereas the Sixth Form (years 12 and 13) are coeducational.

The college is under the trusteeship of the Brothers of Christian Instruction. Their mission is that of their founder, Jean Marie de la Mennais, "To make Jesus better known and loved".

The school is a specialist school for mathematics and computing, and was the first school in Liverpool to gain specialist school status in that category.

Origins and history 
The college was founded in 1842 in association with Stonyhurst College, Lancashire by the Society of Jesus which is a Roman Catholic religious order.

1842–1843: Soho Street 
The college had a rector from 1842 to 1844. It had two pupils.

1843–1845: St. Anne Street 
A year later, it had a dozen pupils. Father Francis Lythgoe moved the college to St. Anne Street where it stayed until 1845.

1846–1877: Salisbury Street 
In 1844 Father Johnson took over from Father Francis Lythgoe and moved his 24 pupils to the newly opened Presbytery on Salisbury Street. Father Collyns took over the college in 1853.

With more than 50 pupils the rector Father Collyns decided that a new premises was needed. By 1856 the college had its own building built alongside the Presbytery and in 1877 a new college was built on 6 Salisbury Street.

Second college building 
The newest Salisbury Street building was designed by Henry Clutton, a Catholic architect. He used the designs of Father Vaughan as the bases of his designs. The new college was completed in the summer of 1877 and cost £30,000.

Move to Woolton 
In 1961 the college was transferred as a grammar school to its present twenty-six-acre site at High Lee, Woolton.
From 1984 to 1990 the Lower School site for Years 7, 8 and 9 was located on Queens Drive (Formerly Cardinal Newman RC) in Wavertree L15. Later, the Lower School was re-sited with the Upper School at High Lee. In 1990, the college opted out of local authority control, becoming a grant-maintained school. The college was granted Technology College status from April 1996. In September 1999 it became a Foundation School. In 1992, the college became co-educational in the sixth form and in September 2000 the De La Mennais Sixth Form Centre was opened.

School choir 
The choir was formed in 1994 and has performed in front of Pope John Paul II. They have toured Europe and the United States, and gained a place in the Guinness Book of Records for singing at every cathedral in England and Wales.

The school sang on the reworked version of The Farm's 1990 hit "Alltogethernow", remixed by BBC Radio 1's DJ Spoony. The single, which reached number 10 in the UK Singles Chart, was the official song for the England football team at the UEFA Euro 2004 competition. It was performed by the choir on Top of the Pops in 2004.

Controversy 
In December 2005, Keith Knowles, a music teacher at the school and choirmaster, was arrested by police on suspicion of possessing indecent images of children, and was bailed pending further enquiries.

Knowles was suspended from his teaching post at the school and in April 2006 was charged with 15 counts of making and 8 counts of possessing child pornography.

In November 2006 he was found guilty at Liverpool City Magistrate's Court of all 15 counts of making child pornography and 6 out of the 8 counts of possessing it. The Liverpool Echo reported that the 15 images were of young boys downloaded from the internet, whereas the others were of an ex-girlfriend when she was much younger.

In June 2007, Keith Knowles was cleared of his charges after an appeal to Liverpool's Appeal Court. He was released after nineteen months in prison and said of the experience: Justice has been done. It has been an horrific 19 months."

The chief witness in his prosecution, Hayley Doyle, had a mental breakdown after Keith Knowles's release. She went as far as to threatening to kill the at-the-time headmaster of the school, Mr L D Rippon. Hayley Doyle was dismissed from the school and sent to live in a psychiatric clinic. She maintains her own innocence and Keith Knowles's guilt.

Head Teachers

Notable alumni 
 James Clement Baxter – Liberal politician and former chairman of Everton FC
 Piaras Béaslaí (Percy Beazley) – Irish revolutionary and writer
 Charles Brabin –  American film director
 Keith Briffa – climatologist
 Elvis Costello – musician, singer, and songwriter
 Denis Cosgrove – former professor of geography at the University of California, Los Angeles
 Gabriel George Coury – recipient of the Victoria Cross
 Chris Crookall – actor
 Walter Bryan Emery – former Edwards Professor of Egyptian Archaeology and Philology at University College London
 Jon Flanagan – footballer
 Paul Gallagher – Roman Catholic cleric and diplomat, titular archbishop of Hodelm
 John Gregson – actor
 Franny Griffiths – musician
 Augustine Harris – Catholic Bishop of Middlesbrough from 1978 to 1992, prison chaplain at HM Prison Liverpool from 1952 to 1965
 George Hartland – Conservative MP for Norwich from 1931 to 1935
 Paul Aloysius Kenna – recipient of the Victoria Cross
 Lancelot Lawton – British historian, military officer, scholar of Ukrainian studies
 Sammy Lee – former footballer and assistant manager of Liverpool FC
 George Lynskey – High Court judge on the former King's Bench
 Vincent Malone – bishop
 Jimmy McGovern – screenwriter
 Brian Nash - musician
 Mike Newell – footballer
 Laurence O'Keeffe – UK ambassador to Czechoslovakia from 1988 to 1991, and to Senegal from 1982 to 1985
 Edward J. Phelan – director-general of the International Labour Organization
 Paul Raymond – publisher of pornographic magazines
 Peter Serafinowicz – actor, writer, comedian
Leslie Stuart – composer of Edwardian musical comedies
 Tony Warner – footballer
 Michael Xavier – musical theatre actor

See also 
 St Francis Xavier
 St Francis Xavier Church, Liverpool
 Secondary school
 Foundation school
 List of Jesuit sites

References 
Notes

Bibliography

External links 
 
 St. Francis Xavier's College Ofsted Reports
 EduBase

Boys' schools in Merseyside
Secondary schools in Liverpool
Catholic secondary schools in the Archdiocese of Liverpool
Catholic universities and colleges in England
Educational institutions established in 1842
1842 establishments in England
Academies in Liverpool